Bing is a cultivar of the wild or sweet cherry (Prunus avium) that originated in the Pacific Northwest, in Milwaukie, Oregon, United States. The Bing remains a major cultivar in Oregon, Washington, California, Wisconsin and British Columbia. It is the most produced variety of sweet cherry in the United States.

History 
The cultivar was derived from an open pollination cross between maternal parent Black Republican and paternal parent Royal Ann (also known as 'Napoleon') in 1875 by Oregon horticulturist Seth Lewelling and his Manchurian Chinese foreman Ah Bing, for whom the cultivar is named.

Ah Bing was reportedly born in China and immigrated to the U.S. in about 1855. He worked as a foreman in the Lewelling family fruit orchards in Milwaukie for about 35 years, supervising other workers and caring for trees. He went back to China in 1889 for a visit. Due to the restrictions of the Chinese Exclusion Act of 1882 he never returned to the United States. Sources disagree as to whether Ah Bing was responsible for developing the cultivar, or whether it was developed by Lewelling and named in Bing's honor due to his long service as orchard foreman.

Horticultural production 
Bing cherries are used almost exclusively for fresh market. Bings are large, dark and firm cherries that ship well, but will crack open if exposed to rain near harvest. A dry-summer climate is required for the harvest of the Bing cherry, making them especially well adapted to the climates of the Pacific Northwest and California.

Health
Bing cherries are high in antioxidants. A study by the United States Department of Agriculture suggests that fresh Bing cherries may help sufferers of arthritis and gout. However, the U.S. Food and Drug Administration warns that these claims are yet unproven.

See also
Bing (disambiguation)
 List of foods named after people

References

External links
All about cherries

Cherry cultivars
Agriculture in Oregon
1875 establishments in Oregon